Georg Herman Krohn (16 August 1831 – 15 May 1870) was a Norwegian actor.

He was born in Bergen. He made his debut at Det Norske Theater in 1856, and later worked at Christiania Norske Theater and Christiania Theater.

He was the father-in-law of William Duborgh and Bertram Dybwad.

References

1831 births
1870 deaths
Actors from Bergen
19th-century Norwegian male actors